Architecture schools in the United States are university schools and colleges that aim to educate students in the field of architecture. Only about one-fifth of enrollees graduate.

Professional degrees
There are three types of professional degrees in architecture in the United States:

Bachelor of Architecture (B.Arch), typically a 5-year program
Master of Architecture (M.Arch), typically a 2 or 3-year program 
Doctor of Architecture (D.Arch), exclusive to the University of Hawaii at Manoa

Non-professional degrees include:

Bachelor of Arts in Architecture (BA)
Bachelor of Science in Architecture (BS)
Bachelor of Fine Arts in Architecture (BFA Arch)
Bachelor of Environmental Design (B.Envd or B.E.D.)

A non-professional degree typically takes four years to complete and may be part of the later completion of professional degree (A "4+2" plan comprises a 4-year BA or BS in Architecture followed by a 2-year Master of Architecture). The 5-year BArch and 6-year MArch are regarded as virtual equals in the registration and accreditation processes.

A professional Bachelor of Architecture degree takes five years to complete. (There is a 3-year B.Arch program offered by Florida Atlantic University articulated with an AA degree in architecture.) There are also M.Arch programs for those with undergraduate degrees in areas outside architecture; these program typically take six or seven semester (3 or  years) to complete.

Other programs (such as those offered at University of Cincinnati, Drexel University, Boston Architectural College and NewSchool of Architecture and Design combine the required educational courses with the work component necessary to sit for the professional licensing exams. Programs such as this often afford students the ability to immediately test for licensure upon graduation, as opposed to having to put in several years working in the field after graduation before being able to get licensed, as is common in more traditional programs.

Some architecture schools, such as Florida International University, offer the Master of Architecture degree in an accelerated five-year or six-year format without the need of a bachelor's degree. There is currently an ongoing debate to upgrade the 3.5 year M.Arch title to D.Arch both for current students and retroactively for 3.5 year M.Arch graduates.

Rankings
Each year, the journal DesignIntelligence ranks both undergraduate and graduate architecture programs that are accredited by the National Architectural Accrediting Board. These rankings, collectively called "America's Best Architecture & Design Schools" are obtained by surveying hundreds of practicing architecture leaders with direct and recent experience hiring and supervising architects. They are asked what programs they consider to be best preparing students for professional success overall. They are also asked to cite the programs they consider to be the best in educating and training for specific skills. These skills rankings are also published in "America's Best Architecture & Design Schools."

Founded in 1912 to advance the quality of architectural education, the Association of Collegiate Schools of Architecture (ACSA) represents all accredited programs and their faculty across the United States and Canada, as well as nonaccredited and international affiliate members around the world. The ACSA collects detailed information from these schools for its "Guide to Architecture Schools," which exists both as a book and as a free online searchable database at archschools.org. These publications are the only complete directories of all accredited professional architecture programs in North America and are used as a reference for prospective students, graduate students, educators, administrators, counselors, and practitioners. The ACSA Guide to Architecture Schools features detailed program descriptions, an index of specialized and related degree programs, an overview of the profession of architecture and the education process, advice on how to select the right school, and scholarship and financial aid information.

In addition, "America's Best Architecture & Design Schools" each year presents Architect Registration Examination pass rates by school, a historical review of top architecture schools, how current architecture students rank their schools, and a directory of accredited programs.

These particular alphabetical lists do not compute with a DI.net average of the past decade, leaving out a series of other brilliant institutions and including others that have just recently made the lists. The following schools have consistently been ranked within the top 17 of all undergraduate architecture schools in the nation. In alphabetical order, the top 17 schools are: Auburn University, Boston Architectural College, California Polytechnic State University, Carnegie Mellon University, Cooper Union, Cornell University, Iowa State University, Pratt Institute, Rhode Island School of Design, Rice University, Southern California Institute of Architecture, Syracuse University, University of Notre Dame, University of Oregon, University of Southern California, University of Texas at Austin, and Virginia Polytechnic Institute.

The following schools are top 10 graduate schools, in order, according to "America's Best Architecture & Design Schools 2014": Harvard University, Yale University, Columbia University, Massachusetts Institute of Technology, Cornell University tied with Rice University, University of Michigan, Kansas State University, University of California, Berkeley, University of Texas at Austin.

List of architecture schools in the United States

See also
List of international architecture schools

References